A tava is a large disc-shaped frying pan.

Tava may also refer to:

Tava (soft drink), a carbonated beverage fortified with vitamins and minerals, released by PepsiCo, 2008–2009
Tava (butterfly), a genus of skipper butterflies in the tribe Moncina
Transgender American Veterans Association (TAVA), an advocacy group for transgender veterans from the US military
Tavas, a town and district, Denizli Province, Turkey
Birinci Udullu or Tava), a village and municipality, Hajigabul District, Azerbaijan

See also
Tava lokam, one of the Seven Logas in Ayyavazhi mythology
Tawa (disambiguation)